Parasitic worms, also known as helminths, are large macroparasites; adults can generally be seen with the naked eye. Many are intestinal worms that are soil-transmitted and infect the gastrointestinal tract. Other parasitic worms such as  schistosomes reside in blood vessels.

Some parasitic worms, including leeches and monogeneans, are ectoparasites thus, they are not classified as helminths, which are endoparasites.

Parasitic worms live in and feed in living hosts. They receive nourishment and protection while disrupting their hosts' ability to absorb nutrients. This can cause weakness and disease in the host, and poses a global health and economic problem. Parasitic worms cannot reproduce entirely within their host's body; they have a life cycle that includes some stages that need to take place outside of the host. Helminths are able to survive in their mammalian hosts for many years due to their ability to manipulate the host's immune response by secreting immunomodulatory products. All parasitic worms produce eggs during reproduction. These eggs have a strong shell that protects them against a range of environmental conditions. The eggs can therefore survive in the environment for many months or years.

Many of the worms referred to as helminths are intestinal parasites. An infection by a helminth is known as helminthiasis, helminth infection, or intestinal worm infection. There is a naming convention which applies to all helminths: the ending "-asis" (or in veterinary science: "-osis") is added at the end of the name of the worm to denote the infection with that particular worm. For example, Ascaris is the name of a type of helminth, and ascariasis is the name of the infection caused by that helminth.

Taxonomy 

Helminths are a group of organisms which share a similar form but are not necessarily related as part of evolution. The term "helminth" is an artificial term. There is no real consensus on the taxonomy (or groupings) of the helminths, particularly within the nematodes. The term "helminth" contains a number of phyla, many of which are completely unrelated. However, for practical considerations the term is currently used to describe four phyla with superficial similarities: Annelida (ringed or segmented worms), Platyhelminthes (flatworms), Nematoda (roundworms), and Acanthocephala (thorny-headed worms). The phylum Platyhelminthes includes two classes of worms of particular medical significance: the cestodes (tapeworms) and the trematodes (flukes and blood flukes), depending on whether or not they have segmented bodies.

There may be as many as 300,000 species of parasites affecting vertebrates, and as many as 300 affecting humans alone.

Helminths of importance in the sanitation field are the human parasites, and are classified as Nemathelminthes (nematodes) and Platyhelminthes, depending on whether they possess a round or flattened body, respectively.

Ringworm (dermatophytosis) is actually caused by various fungi and not by a parasitic worm.

Reproduction and life cycle 
The lifetime of adult worms varies tremendously from one species to another but is generally in the range of 1 to 8 years (see following table). This lifetime of several years is a result of their ability to manipulate the immune response of their hosts by secreting immunomodulatory products.

Helminths can be either hermaphroditic (having the sex organs of both sexes), like tapeworms and flukes (not including the blood fluke), or have their sexes differentiated, like the roundworms.

All helminths produce eggs (also called ova) for reproduction.

Eggs
Generally, thousands or even hundreds of thousands of eggs are produced each time the female worm deposits its eggs - a process called oviposition. There is a large variation in the number of eggs produced by different species of worm at one time; it varies in the range of 3,000 to 700,000. The frequency of egg deposition from an adult helminth is generally daily, and can occur up to six times per day for some Taenia species. Adult trematodes lay smaller numbers of eggs compared to cestodes or nematodes. However, the egg develops into a miracidia from which thousands of cercariae, or swimming larvae, develop. This means that one egg may produce thousands of adult worms. Helminth eggs remain viable for 1–2 months in crops and for many months in soil, fresh water, and sewage, or even for several years in feces, fecal sludge (historically called night soil), and sewage sludge – a period that is much longer compared to other microorganisms.

Helminth eggs are resistant to various environmental conditions due to the composition of the egg shell. Each helminth egg species has 3 to 4 layers with different physical and chemical characteristics:

Larvae 
Larvae hatch from eggs, either inside or outside the host, depending on the type of helminth. For eggs in moist soil at optimal temperature and oxygen levels, the embryo develops into an infective larva after 2 to 4 weeks, named "second-stage larva". Once ingested by a host, this larva has the ability to get out of the egg, hatch in the small intestine and migrate to different organs. These infective larvae (or "infective eggs") may remain viable in soil for two years or longer.

The process of larval maturation in the host can take from about two weeks up to four months, depending on the helminth species.

The following table shows the principal morphological and reproductive distinctions for three helminth groups:

Draft genomes for all categories of helminth have been sequenced in recent years and are available through the ParaSite sub-portal of WormBase.

Use in medicine

Parasitic worms have been used as a medical treatment for various diseases, particularly those involving an overactive immune response. As humans have evolved with parasitic worms, proponents argue they are needed for a healthy immune system. Scientists are looking for a connection between the prevention and control of parasitic worms and the increase in allergies such as hay-fever in developed countries. Removal of parasitic worms from areas is correlated with an increase in autoimmune disorders in those areas. Parasitic worms may be able to damp down the immune system of their host, making it easier for them to live in the intestine without coming under attack. This may be one mechanism for their proposed medicinal effect.

One study suggests a link between the rising rates of metabolic syndrome in the developed worlds and the largely successful efforts of Westerners to eliminate intestinal parasites.  The work suggests eosinophils (a type of white blood cell) in fat tissue play an important role in preventing insulin resistance by secreting interleukin 4, which in turn switches macrophages into "alternative activation".  Alternatively-activated macrophages are important to maintaining glucose homeostasis (i.e., blood sugar regulation).  Helminth infection causes an increase in eosinophils.  In the study, the authors fed rodents a high-fat diet to induce metabolic syndrome, and then injected them with helminths.  Helminth infestation improved the rodents' metabolism.  The authors concluded:

Although sparse in blood of persons in developed countries, eosinophils are often elevated in individuals in rural developing countries where intestinal parasitism is prevalent and metabolic syndrome rare.  We speculate that eosinophils may have evolved to optimize metabolic homeostasis during chronic infections by ubiquitous intestinal parasites….

Human stool samples 
For medical purposes, the exact number of helminth eggs is less important and therefore most diagnoses are made simply by identifying the appearance of the worm or eggs in feces. Due to the large quantity of eggs laid, physicians can diagnose using as few as one or two fecal smears. The Kato technique (also called the Kato-Katz technique) is a laboratory method for preparing human stool samples prior to searching for parasite eggs. Eggs per gram is a laboratory test that determines the number of eggs per gram of feces in patients suspected of having a parasitological infection, such as schistosomiasis.

Relevance for sanitation 

Helminth eggs can reach the soil when polluted wastewater, sewage sludge or human waste are used as fertilizer. Such soil is often characterized by moist and warm conditions. Therefore, the risk of using contaminated wastewater and sludge in agricultural fields is a real problem, especially in poor countries, where this practice is prevalent. Helminth eggs are regarded as the main biological health risk when applying sewage sludge, fecal sludge or fecal matter on agricultural soils. The eggs are the infective stage of the helminths’ life cycle for causing the disease helminthiasis.

Due to this strong shell, helminth eggs or ova remain viable in soil, fresh water and sewage for many months. In feces, fecal sludge and sewage sludge they can even remain viable for several years. Helminth eggs of concern in wastewater used for irrigation have a size between 20 and 90 μm and a relative density of 1.06–1.23.  It is very difficult to inactivate helminth eggs, unless temperature is increased above 40 °C or moisture is reduced to less than 5%. Eggs that are no longer viable do not produce any larvae. In the case of Ascaris lumbricoides (giant roundworm), which has been considered the most resistant and common helminth type, fertilized eggs deposited in soil are resistant to desiccation but are, at this stage of development, very sensitive to environmental temperatures: The reproduction of a fertilized egg within the eggshell develops at an environmental soil temperature about 25 °C which is lower than the body temperature of the host (i.e., 37 °C for humans). However, development of the larvae in the egg stops at temperatures below 15.5 °C, and eggs cannot survive temperatures much above 38 °C. If the temperature is around 25 °C, the infectiousness occurs after nearly 10 days of incubation.

Removal versus inactivation 
In order to physically remove (but not inactivate) helminth eggs from wastewater, processes that remove particles, such as sedimentation, filtration or coagulation-flocculation are employed. Therefore, waste stabilization ponds (lagoons), storage basins, constructed wetlands, rapid filtration or upflow anaerobic sludge blanket (UASB) reactors can be used.

Helminth ova cannot be inactivated with chlorine, UV light or ozone (in the latter case at least not with economical doses because >36 mg/L ozone are needed with 1 hour contact time).

Inactivation of helminth ova can be achieved in sewage sludge treatment where the temperature is increased over 40 °C or moisture is reduced to less than 5%. Best results can be obtained when both of these conditions are combined for an extended period of time. Details about the contact time under these conditions and other related environmental factors are generally not well-defined for every type of helminth egg species. Helminth eggs are considered highly resistant biological structures.

Measurements

Indicator organism

Environmental samples 
For the purpose of setting treatment standards and reuse legislation, it is important to be able to determine the amount of helminth eggs in an environmental sample with some accuracy. The detection of viable helminth eggs in samples of wastewater, sludge or fresh feces (as a diagnostic tool for the infection helminthiasis) is not straight forward. In fact, many laboratories in developing countries lack the right equipment or skilled staff required to do so. An important step in the analytical methods is usually the concentration of the eggs in the sample, especially in the case of wastewater samples. A concentration step may not be required in samples of dried feces, e.g. samples collected from urine-diverting dry toilets.

See also 

 Helminthology the study of parasitic worms and their effects on their hosts

References

Further reading 
 Dickson Despommier, People, Parasites, and Plowshares: Learning from Our Body's Most Terrifying Invaders, Columbia University Press, 2016.

External links

 Parasitic Roundworm Diseases
 World Health Organisation (WHO) topic page on Intestinal worms

Ascaridida
Conditions diagnosed by stool test
Foodborne illnesses
Helminthiases
Intestinal infectious diseases
Tropical diseases
Parasitic protostomes
Sanitation